Leek railway station served the town of Leek, Staffordshire. It was opened by the North Staffordshire Railway in 1849. Passenger services to Uttoxeter were withdrawn in 1965, with complete closure following in 1970. For a short time in 1961–62, special football excursions (the Stanley Matthews Express) were arranged to Stoke following the return of Stanley Matthews to Stoke City FC.

History
Freight workings continued until 1970.

The site of the station is now occupied by a Morrisons supermarket, although the road bridge is still in situ between the latter's car park and petrol station.

Future 

In 2009, Moorlands and City Railways Ltd (MCR) bought the 20 miles of railway line from Stoke in the west-direction of Leek, with a view to reconnect Leek with the national network.

A new station could be constructed in Leek, possibly on the Cornhill development on the outskirts of the town, although the MCR would prefer a station closer to the town centre. Following its initial refusal of planning permission in September 2014, Moorlands District Council accepted a second proposal which would see a station provided next to the 17-acre Barnfield Industrial Estate in Cornhill, on a site previously occupied by Hughes Concrete Products. The new station would become the Churnet Valley Railway's northern terminus and the headquarters of the MCR. The ¾-mile extension from  would be funded by the sale of land within a triangle at Leekbrook for housing.

Route

References

Disused railway stations in Staffordshire
Railway stations in Great Britain closed in 1965
Railway stations in Great Britain opened in 1849
Buildings and structures in Leek
Former North Staffordshire Railway stations
Beeching closures in England
1849 establishments in England